Lindi is a suburb of Nairobi, the capital of Kenya.  It belongs to the major slum of Kibera. As for Laini Saba, another village within Kibera, its population is estimated at 100,000. Soweto East is another village belonging to Kibera.  The price of water there clearly is above Nairobi average. 
 A Lindi Friends Primary School exists.

Other slums in the Nairobi area 
Dandora
Huruma
Kiambiu
Korogocho
Mathare
Mukuru kwa Njenga
Pumwani

Notes

Suburbs of Nairobi
Slums in Kenya
Squatting in Kenya